The 2005 Longueuil municipal election took place on November 6, 2005, to elect a mayor and city councillors in Longueuil, Quebec, Canada.

Claude Gladu was elected to his third term as mayor, and first term of the re-constituted city of Longueuil. His party won 19 of the 26 seats on Longueuil City Council.

Results

Mayor

Councillors

Vieux-Longueuil

Greenfield Park

Saint-Hubert

References

Longueuil
2005